The Inspector Jamshed series was written by Pakistani author Ishtiaq Ahmad. It is a series of crime novels and features a detective, Inspector Jamshed, who solves crimes with the help of his three children.

The novels were planned to be turned into a web series in 2020.

References

External links
 

Crime novel series
Urdu-language novels
Pakistani spy novels